Sherkat-e Shang Shakan-e Rostaq (also Romanized as Sherkat-e Shang Shakan-e Rostāq) is a village in Rostaq Rural District, Rostaq District, Darab County, Fars Province, Iran. At the 2006 census, its population was 20, in 5 families.

References 

Populated places in Darab County